Cahiracon, sometimes written as Caheracon, is a small coastal village and townland in County Clare, Ireland. The village is just off the R473 road and directly across the Shannon Estuary from Foynes in County Limerick. It is home to Saint John Bosco Community College, founded in 2002 as the result of an amalgamation of two older institutions. Cahiracon is within the civil parish of Killadysert and barony of Clonderalaw.

Cahiracon is also where the religious order, the Missionary Sisters of St. Columban, became a reality in 1922.

See also
 List of towns and villages in Ireland

References

External links
Cahiracon House
St. John Bosco Community College

Towns and villages in County Clare